Emma Kate Corkhill (1866December 13, 1913) was an early female professor of coeducational universities with a Ph.D. degree in the United States and an academic in English Literature.

Early life 
Emma Kate Corkhill was born in 1866 to the Reverend Dr. Thomas Edward Corkhill (1822－1897) and Lucinda Crawford Corkhill (1823－1903) and the younger sister of Lulu Corkhill Williams (1854－1935). She grew up in the Southern Iowa with her family as her father was a Methodist minister in Southeast Iowa area and spent most of her early days there in Iowa. 

She attended the Iowa Wesleyan University, Mount Pleasant, Iowa, with her sister Lulu and was graduated from the university with B.A. in 1889, and M.A. in 1892. Soon after the graduation from the Iowa Wesleyan University, she went up to Boston, Massachusetts, and earned the degree of Ph.D. from Boston University in 1893.

Research and teaching

Boston University and University of Edinburgh 
The title of Emma Kate Corkhill's doctoral dissertation was The Growth of Shakespeare's Mind and Art, which was submitted in partial fulfillment of requirements for the degree of Doctor of Philosophy in the Boston University Graduate School in 1893. After the completion of doctoral degree, she spent one year (1905-1906) at the University of Edinburgh in Scotland, for the special study of English Literature.

Iowa Wesleyan University and Simpson College 
At first, she taught a short time at her alma mater, Iowa Wesleyan University, and then at Simpson College in Indianola, Iowa, for seven years (1896ー1902) as a professor. In 1898, during the summer, she helped a Japanese student named S. Tetsu Tamura, who later became a meteorologist, for his novel composition entitled Kwaiku: Recollections of the Past published in this year.

Lawrence College (University) 
In 1902, she moved to Mount Pleasant in Wisconsin to become the chair (Edwards Alexander Professor) of English Literature at Lawrence College, now Lawrence University and stayed until her death in 1913.

Later life 
According to the alumni record of the Lawrence University, during the summer in 1911, Professor Corkhill was sick and given leave of absence for the first semester of the following academic year. Fortunately, she could teach again from February of the following year 1912 to Fall of 1913. But she was advised by the doctor to be hospitalized on December 11, 1913 and died two days later on December 13, 1913.

She was buried with her parents at Forest Home Cemetery in Mount Pleasant, Iowa.

Poem (posthumous?) 

　　　　　　Answer 

　　　"When wouldst thou have me give? 
　　　Each day, each hour, thou favored one! 
　　　From gray of dawn to set of sun! 
　　　And when the sky with stars is set
　　　Pursue the grace of giving yet. 

　　　"How wouldst thou have me give? 
　　　With joy and utter lavishness! 
　　　Keep nothing back thyself to bless! 
　　　Gladly give all, in surety
　　　Thy wealth to find in charity. 

　　　"When wouldst thou have me give? 
　　　And canst thou ask? Art rich but blind? 
　　　On every hand a need thou'lt find! 
　　　A need for friendship, hope, and prayer, 
　　　To lift a soul up from despair! 
　　　A need for inspiration strong
　　　That life's dull steps may lead to song! 

　　　"When wouldst thou have me give? 
　　　Is Calvary's gray cross quite forgot? 
　　　And what it brought thee ― knowst thou not? 
　　　Thy service give to others free! 
　　　So shall thou give thyself to me!

See also 
American women

References

External Links 
Iowa Wesleyan University 
Boston University
The University of Edinburgh
Simpson College 
Lawrence University

1866 births
1913 deaths
Simpson College faculty
Shakespearean scholars
Iowa Wesleyan University alumni
Boston University alumni
Lawrence University faculty